Muhammad Mahmood Alam Road (Sarak-e-Muhammad Mahmood Alam), or more popularly known as M. M. Alam Road, is a major road in Lahore, Punjab, Pakistan named in honour of the Pakistan Air Force flying ace, Air Commodore Muhammad Mahmood Alam. The road extends from Gulberg Main Market to Firdous Market in Gulberg, and runs parallel to Gulberg Boulevard thus providing an alternate route. The road hosts a variety of flamboyant restaurants, fashion boutiques, shopping malls, beauty saloons and décor stores.

History 
The road is named after flying ace of Pakistan Air Force, Air Commodore Muhammad Mahmood Alam who was the recipient of the Pakistani military decoration, the Sitara-e-Jurrat (The star of courage) and a bar to it for his dog fight during the Indo Pakistan War of 1965 when he downed five Indian aircraft in less than a minute, the first four within 30 seconds, establishing a world record. It used to be a residential area, which quickly became commercial with the opening up of many private schools and later fashion studios like Jafferjees and international and national restaurants such as KFC, Nandos and Pizza Hut. It has been renovated to cope with the heavy traffic and night life of the area.

Recently Tim Hortons has open their first branch near to MM Alam Road in Gulberg, Lahore.

Rehabilitation 
Widening and rehabilitation of the road project initiated by Punjab Government started in November, 2012 and was completed in March 2013.

References 

Culture in Lahore
Tourist attractions in Lahore
Roads in Lahore
Shopping districts and streets in Pakistan
Restaurant districts and streets in Pakistan